Adi Ulmansky is a rapper and music producer originally from Jerusalem.

Music career
Since 2007, Ulmansky has made several TV appearances and released several music videos to Israeli music TV channel Music 24 and MTV Israel, including collaborations with leading directors like Vania Heymann. Adi released her debut solo mixtape 'Shit Just Got Real' in January 2013 and her following solo EP 'Hurricane Girl' in August 2013. Adi was also the founder and leader of the band Lorena B and also collaborated with other artists like Johnny Goldstein as well as the producer Borgore with whom she released several high-profile tracks like 'Someone Else's' with 1.5 million views on YouTube. She's been focusing on her solo career since late 2012, getting a lot of worldwide online and printed press coverage from Vice, Mixmag, The Guardian, Jay-Z's Life + Times, The Independent, leading local press like Yedioth Ahronoth, Maariv and Haaretz newspapers to fashion coverage like Topshop Inside-Out official blog and ASOS.com blog and mobile app, and many more. Her latest single and music video 'Falling' has premiered on Vice's 'You Need To Hear This' section as well as getting into the playlists of popular radio stations in Israel - Galgalatz, IBA's 88FM and others.

In 2012, Ulmansky was selected by American Express for their The Young Professionals project as the only musician from a group of 9 leading young individuals in Israel. The project accompanied the re-launching of American Express BLUE card in Israel and was a collaboration with the band TYP, Keshet TV's Mako and Timeout Tel Aviv.

In June 2014, Ulmansky performed at Glastonbury Festival.

In October 2015, Ulmansky released "Pink Pillz"

In August 2016, Ulmansky released "Higher" featuring rapper Curtis Williams. In November 2016, Ulmansky released "Dreamin'" featuring rapper KDC, The main song off her new EP by the same name. On 9 December 2016, Ulmansky released her EP,  Dreamin' .

On 15 October 2018, Ulmansky released her debut album, BAD INTENTIONS.

Discography

Solo albums
Shit Just Got Real mixtape (2013) 
Hurricane Girl EP (2013) 
DREAMIN' EP (2016)
BAD INTENTIONS (2019)

Lorena B albums

Siblings (2011) 
Lorena B EP (2012)

Features
The Johnny Show (2008) - Lishkoah Meakol Ft. Adi Ulmansky 
Gorestep: Vol. 1.1 (2009; Shift Recordings) - 5 Years VIP (Björk's cover) Ft. Adi Ulmansky
Borgore Ruined Dubstep, Pt. 2 (2010; Buygore) - Broken Rulz feat. Adi Ulmansky 
Delicious EP (2011; Buygore) - Someone Else's' (feat. Adi Ulmansky)
Turn Up EP (October 8, 2012) - Why Does It Feel Borgore feat. Adi Ulmansky
Legend EP (June 7, 2013; Buygore) - Kill Them All (feat. Adi Ulmansky)

Music videos
Ulmansky's visual style varies with each collaboration and video production.

References

External links 

Living people
Israeli women rappers
21st-century Israeli women singers
Israeli electronic musicians
Kokhav Nolad contestants
Israeli women record producers
Israeli hip hop record producers
Year of birth missing (living people)